Dysgonia calefasciens is a moth of the family Noctuidae first described by Achille Guenée in 1852. It is found from the north-eastern parts of the Himalayas, Thailand, Sundaland, Sri Lanka, the Philippines to Seram Island.

References

External links

Dysgonia
Moths described in 1852
Moths of Asia
Moths of Sri Lanka
Moths of the Philippines